The Training Development Branch is a personnel branch of the Canadian Armed Forces (CAF). It primarily deals in training and development of both new recruits and experienced officers, airmen and -women, sailors and soldiers of the CAF.

Training

Canadian Forces Training Development Centre
The Canadian Forces Training Development Centre (CFTDC) in Borden, Ontario is the Centre of Excellence for training and training development for the Department of National Defence DND and the Canadian Forces.

Mission
The CFTDC mission is to provide training in instructional methods and training development, e-Learning development services, and training development support to the CF. The CFTDC also provides advice and guidance on instructional design and delivery of training to CF training establishments across the country. In addition, CFTDC is active in the evaluation, research and development of training methods and technologies.

References

External links

Canadian Forces Recruiting
Canadian Forces and Department of National Defence
Canadian Forces BMQ (Basic Military Qualification)
Canadian Forces website (forces.ca)

Canadian Armed Forces personnel branches
Military history of Canada